This article provides details of international football games played by the Bangladesh national football team from 1973 to 1999.

Results

1973

1975

1976

1978

1979

1980

1982

1983

1984

1985

1986

1987

1988

1989

1990

1991

1992

1993

1994

1995

1997

1998

1999

References

1973
1970s in Bangladeshi sport
1980s in Bangladeshi sport
1990s in Bangladeshi sport